The Romanul is a left tributary of the river Gilort in Romania. Its source is in the Parâng Mountains. It flows into the Gilort north of Novaci.

References

Rivers of Romania
Rivers of Gorj County